The District School Board of Sarasota, commonly known as Sarasota County Schools, is a public school district serving all of Sarasota County, Florida. As of 2017, the total number of students is approximately 43,150.

The school district's leadership is often known internally and externally by the metonym The Landings, based on the location of its headquarters in The Landings neighborhood in South Sarasota.

Elementary schools

Middle schools
Booker Middle School
Sarasota School of Arts and Sciences 
Brookside Middle School
Heron Creek Middle School
McIntosh Middle School
Sarasota Middle School
Venice Middle School
Woodland Middle School

K-8 school
Laurel Nokomis School

High schools

Booker High School
North Port High School
Riverview High School
Sarasota High School
Venice High School
Suncoast Polytechnical High School

Special schools
Suncoast Technical College
Pine View School (2-12) 
Oak Park
Adult and Community Enrichment Center
North Triad
South Triad

Charter schools
Sarasota School of Arts and Sciences
Sarasota Suncoast Academy
Suncoast School for Innovative Studies
Island Village Montessori
Sarasota Military Academy
SKY Academy
Student Leadership Academy
Goodwill Academy
Imagine School of North Port

References

External links
 Sarasota County Schools official website

School districts in Florida
Education in Sarasota County, Florida